Berástegui Airport  is an airport serving the town of Ciénaga de Oro in the Córdoba Department of Colombia.

See also

Transport in Colombia
List of airports in Colombia

References

External links
FallingRain - Berástegui Airport

Airports in Colombia